Pseudochaeta is a genus of flies in the family Tachinidae.

Species
Subgenus Metopiops Townsend, 1912
P. pyralidis Coquillett, 1897
Subgenus Phaenopsis Townsend, 1912
P. venusta (Reinhard, 1946)
P. arabella Townsend, 1912
Subgenus Pseudochaeta Coquillett, 1895
P. argentifrons Coquillett, 1895
P. canadensis Brooks, 1945
P. brooksi Sabrosky & Arnaud, 1963
P. clurina Reinhard, 1946
P. finalis Reinhard, 1946
P. frontalis Reinhard, 1946
P. marginalis Reinhard, 1946
P. perdecora Reinhard, 1946
P. robusta (Reinhard, 1924)
P. siminina Reinhard, 1946

References

Exoristinae
Diptera of North America
Tachinidae genera
Taxa named by Daniel William Coquillett